
Year 239 (CCXXXIX) was a common year starting on Tuesday (link will display the full calendar) of the Julian calendar. At the time, it was known as the Year of the Consulship of Gordianus and Aviola (or, less frequently, year 992 Ab urbe condita). The denomination 239 for this year has been used since the early medieval period, when the Anno Domini calendar era became the prevalent method in Europe for naming years.

Events 
 By place 
 Asia 
 Cao Fang succeeds his adoptive father Cao Rui as emperor of the Cao Wei state, in the Three Kingdoms period of China.
 A Chinese expeditionary force from the Eastern Wu state discovers the island of Taiwan.

 By topic 
 Religion 
 Origen publishes the Old Testament in five languages (approximate date).

Deaths 
 January 22 – Cao Rui (or Yuanzhong), Chinese emperor (b. 206)
 Lu Mao (or Zizhang), Chinese official and politician
 Pan Jun (or Chengming), Chinese official and general

References